Giziga language may refer to the following languages of northern Cameroon.

North Giziga language
South Giziga language